Club Deportivo Dragón is a professional Salvadoran  football club based in San Miguel, El Salvador, which plays in the Salvadoran league, Primera division. The first full-time manager for Dragon was TBD.

Jose Mario Martinez is the most successful manager in terms of trophies. He won two segunda division titles .

The second most successful Dragon manager in terms of trophies won is Omar Sevilla, who won one Primera division titles in his 2-year reign as manager.

Dragon managers since 1950 to present days. No prior records found 1933 to 1949.

Managers

This is a list of head coaches of the Salvadoran football club C.D. Dragón. Since the club was formed, Dragón have had TBD coaches

Table key

References

Club Deportivo Dragon